Major League Eating (MLE) is an organization that organises professional competitive eating events and television specials. The stated mission of Major League Eating is to maintain a safe environment for all events, to create a dynamic and enjoyable fan experience, and to help sponsors develop, publicize and execute eating events in a wide variety of food disciplines. The league airs its annual Nathan's Famous Fourth of July International Hot Dog Eating Contest on ESPN.

Brothers George and Richard Shea took over Nathan's publicity in the mid-1990s and were able to increase the exposure and attendance of Nathan's hot dog eating contest. Seeing a business opportunity, the brothers founded International Federation of Competitive Eating (IFOCE) in 1997 as a sanctioning body to oversee/regulate/organize events/TV deals. The primary professional league is known as Major League Eating.

Major League Eating coordinates events in the United States and Canada.

History
The International Federation of Competitive Eating, Inc. (IFOCE) is an organization that supervises and regulates eating contests across the globe, acting as a central resource for the sport.  Top events include the Nathan's Hot Dog Eating Contest, La Costena "Feel the Heat" Jalapeño Eating Challenge, and the Krystal Square Off World Hamburger Eating Championship and the National Buffalo Wing Festival.  The IFOCE was founded in 1997 by brothers George and Richard Shea.

The IFOCE counts thousands of competitors in its league, including top-ranked eaters such as Joey Chestnut of California, "Megatoad" Matt Stonie of California, Sonya Thomas of Virginia, and "Notorious B.O.B." Bob Shoudt of Philadelphia. , the IFOCE  was in a dispute with Takeru Kobayashi of Japan over whether competitors may also participate in contests not sanctioned by the IFOCE.  The IFOCE develops, promotes and runs more than one hundred events in all variety of venues during its annual circuit.  

The organization also produces television shows on competitive eating.  In 2002, IFOCE produced Glutton Bowl, a two-hour eating event on the Fox Network.  In 2007 the IFOCE produced four one-hour programs for Spike TV under the title Chowdown. In 2006, the IFOCE produced three hours of programming on ESPN, including a one-hour live show on the 2005 Nathan's Famous hot dog eating contest and one-hour shows on the Johnsonville Foods Bratwurst contest and the Krystal Hamburger contest.  The Alka-Seltzer U.S. Open of Competitive eating, a three-hour elimination tournament was a 2005 IFOCE production.  In addition, the IFOCE produced four 30-minute shows under the title of Tour de Gorge and six 30-minute shows titled Eats of Strength for INHD.

The IFOCE's primary league is known as Major League Eating.

Gonzo journalist Ryan Nerz MC’d the competition in 2003, after which he wrote his book Eat This Book.

Nationwide branches
The IFOCE maintains principal offices in New York City and operates in the United States. The Discovery Channel, Travel Channel, the TV Food Network and the UK's Channel Four have also aired one-hour documentaries on eating and the IFOCE and Fox Television aired a two-hour IFOCE championship.

The IFOCE maintains a ranking system for competitions it has sanctioned. IFOCE safety measures ensure that all sanctioned matches occur in a controlled environment under the supervision of a licensed emergency medical technician and that only individuals over the age of eighteen compete.

Mustard Yellow Belt
The Mustard Yellow Belt is the organization's signature championship belt. The belt was rediscovered by IFOCE member Mike DeVito in 1993 after being lost for more than two decades in Japan. DeVito received the belt after winning an eating match against Japan's Orio Ito. The belt was restored by the Shea brothers and is now renowned in the competitive eating world. It was held by Takeru Kobayashi from 2001 to 2006 but Kobayashi was beaten by Joey Chestnut in 2007. Chestnut held the Championship Belt for eight years until Matt Stonie beat him at the July Fourth Hot Dog Eating Contest in 2015. Chestnut however reclaimed the title in 2016 when he ate 70 hot dogs and buns. Joey won again in 2017 with 72 hot dogs and buns. In 2018, Chesnut won his 11th title with 74 hot dogs and buns. His 12th title was won in 2019 with 71 hot dogs and buns. He set a new record in 2020 with 75 hot dogs and buns. Chestnut increased his record by winning the 2021 crown with 76 hot dogs and buns, claiming his 14th title in 15 years. Chestnut continued his streak in 2022 by winning his 15th title with 63 hotdogs and buns.

TV ratings
The ESPN2 telecast of the 2014 Nathan's event generated a 1.6 rating and 2.8 million viewers, making it the most watched telecast in the contest's history. The ESPN2 airing also ranks as the 6th highest-rated and 5th most-watched telecast of the year on ESPN2, behind NCAA Football, the NBA and the World Cup.

In 2020, the contest was forced to change its format due to the coronavirus pandemic. As a result, the ratings declined significantly, with the number of viewers dropping below 1 million, even though it was the first professional sport to return during the pandemic.

See also
 Major League Eating: The Game

References

Competitive eating
Organizations established in 1997
Organizations based in New York (state)
Professional sports leagues in the United States